Trautskirchen is a municipality  in the district of Neustadt (Aisch)-Bad Windsheim in Bavaria in Germany.

Personalities
 Hans Böckler (1875 in Trautskirchen - 1951 in Köln-Lindenthal) was a German union leader and politician

References

Neustadt (Aisch)-Bad Windsheim